Aliabad County is in Golestan province, Iran. The capital of the county is the city of Aliabad-e Katul. At the 2006 census, the county's population was 123,923 in 29,944 households. The following census in 2011 counted 132,757 people in 37,827 households. At the 2016 census, the county's population was 140,709 in 42,725 households.

Administrative divisions

The population history and structural changes of Aliabad County's administrative divisions over three consecutive censuses are shown in the following table. The latest census shows two districts, four rural districts, and four cities.

References

 

Counties of Golestan Province